Moord in het Modehuis  is a 1946 Dutch film directed by Alfred Mazure. It was based on his own comic strip Dick Bos  and the third cinematic adaptation of this popular series.

Cast
 Maurice van Nieuwenhuizen ... Dick Bos
 Adolphe Engers ... Keukenchef
 Alfred Mazure
 George Mazure
 Piet Leenhouls ... Nemesis
 Mia Bolleurs
 Piet van der Ham

Sources

1946 films
Dutch black-and-white films
Dutch crime films
Films based on Dutch comics
Live-action films based on comics
Films set in the Netherlands
Films shot in the Netherlands
1946 crime films
1940s Dutch-language films